HMS Seahorse was a Royal Navy fleet tug, tender and survey ship built in 1880. She served until the end of the First World War and was subsequently sold for commercial service in Spain.

Description
HMS Seahorse was designed and built by Laird Brothers at Birkenhead for the Royal Navy as a fast deep-sea tug, suitable for handling their new classes of ironclad warship.  In addition she was equipped for deployment as a fleet tender and despatch vessel. Steel was used in both the engines and shafts and, in the form of Siemens-Martin steel from the Landore Steel Company, for the hull and upperworks. Seahorse'''s displacement was 670 tons, and dimensions  length between perpendiculars,  length overall,  beam and with  draught. She was powered by a pair of compound steam engines totalling 1100 ihp driving twin screws.

Service history
Based at Portsmouth, as well as a fleet tug, Seahorse served in a variety of roles, including survey ship, and was often described as a gunboat or "special service vessel". During the Anglo-Egyptian War of 1882 Seahorse was additionally equipped with gatling guns and stationed at Port Said for towing and patrol duties in the Suez Canal. Amongst her salvage jobs was the battleship HMS Howe, which stranded on a shoal off Ferrol, Spain in November 1892 and could be refloated only five months later. During the First World War she continued to be based at Portsmouth where she was used as a fleet tug, and later a rescue tug.

Commercial service
On 1 May 1920 Seahorse was disposed of by the Admiralty to Crichton Thompson & Co Ltd, and resold to Arsenio Sanjurjo Igual of Santander, Spain, where she was renamed Chita''.  She changed hands twice at Santander, first to Luis Liaño in 1925 and then to Nicolas Pardo y Pardo in 1928. She was finally broken up at Santander in 1933.

Notes

References

See also
The history of tug Chita (in Spanish)

1880 ships
Victorian-era auxiliary ships of the United Kingdom
World War I auxiliary ships of the United Kingdom
Steamships of Spain